Erika Reyes (born 13 October 1973) is a Mexican archer. She competed in the women's individual event at the 2000 Summer Olympics.

References

External links
 

1973 births
Living people
Mexican female archers
Olympic archers of Mexico
Archers at the 2000 Summer Olympics
Sportspeople from Mexico City
Pan American Games medalists in archery
Pan American Games silver medalists for Mexico
Pan American Games bronze medalists for Mexico
Archers at the 1999 Pan American Games
Archers at the 2003 Pan American Games
Medalists at the 1999 Pan American Games
Medalists at the 2003 Pan American Games
20th-century Mexican women